Jung-dong station is a railroad station in South Korea.

 Jung-dong station (Bucheon)
 Jung-dong station (Busan Metro)